The XII Tactical Air Command was a formation of the United States Army Air Forces.  Its last assignment was with the United States Air Forces in Europe at Bad Kissingen, Germany, where it was inactivated on 10 November 1947.

History
The 12th Ground Air Support Command was activated on 17 September 1942 at Birmingham Army Air Field, Alabama, where it drew its initial cadre from the 3d Ground Air Support Command.  Within a week, it had moved to Bolling Field, District of Columbia, to prepare for the invasion of North  Africa and changed its name to XII Air Support Command.

The command participated in Operation Torch, the invasion of North Africa in November 1942.  However, it confined itself to administering air affairs in French Morocco until January 1943.  On 6 January 1943, it was attached to the Satin Task Force, primarily composed of elements of the II Corps and after 13 January was fully engaged with support of II Corps in its attack through central Tunisia.   This campaign proved to be a test for United States air support doctrine and tactics.  No pilots or planes trained for night reconnaissance were available, and photographic reconnaissance with Douglas A-20 Havocs was only available late in the campaign.  Tying the command to a single corps also kept it from supporting other organizations participating in the campaign, such as the French XIX Corps, even when resources were available.

The command served in combat in the Mediterranean and European theaters until May 1945. Afterward, remained in Europe as part of the occupation force.

Colonel Demas T. Craw was awarded the Medal of Honor for action during the invasion of Algeria-French Morocco: when the Allies landed on 8 November 1942, Col Craw volunteered to negotiate an armistice; while trying to pass through the lines near Port Lyautey, he was killed by machine-gun fire.

Lineage
 Constituted as the 12th Ground Air Support Command on 10 September 1942
 Activated on 17 September 1942
 Redesignated XII Air Support Command on 24 September 1942
 Redesignated XII Tactical Air Command in April 1944
 Inactivated in Germany on 10 November 1947
 Disbanded on 8 October 1948

Assignments
 Third Air Force, 17 September 1942 (attached to First Air Force after 25 September 1942)
 Twelfth Air Force, 9 November 1942 (attached to Allied Air Support Command after 22 January 1943)
 Northwest African Air Forces, c. 18 February 1943 (attached to  Allied Air Support Command (later Northwest African Tactical Air Force c. February 18 – 10 December 1943, further attached to No. 242 Group RAF March 43)
 Twelfth Air Force, c. 10 December 1943 (attached to No. 242 Group RAF, Tactical Air Force, Mediterranean Allied Air Forces January 1944 – April 1944)
 United States Air Forces in Europe, 15 November 1945 – 10 November 1947

Stations

 Birmingham Army Air Field, Alabama, 17 September 1942
 Bolling Field, District of Columbia, 25 September – 18 October 1942
 French Morocco, 9 November 1942
 Algeria, January 1943
 Tunisia, 13 March 1943
 Sicily, Italy, c. 12 July 1943

 Italy, c. 9 September 1943
 Corsica, France, 18 August 1944
 Germany, 27 March 1945
 Erlangen (R-96), Germany, July 1945
 Bad Kissingen (R-98), Germany, 1 November 1945 – 10 November 1947

Components
 Wings
 3rd Air Defense Wing (later 64th Fighter Wing): 9 March 1943 – 5 June 1947 (attached to First Tactical Air Force (Provisional) 27 November 1944 – May 1945)
 5th Bombardment Wing: c. 13 October 1942 – 1 November 1943
 7th Fighter Wing, 27 September 1942 – 7 January 1943 (attached to First Air Force to c. 17 October 1942; Task Force A to 8 November 1942; Moroccan Composite Wing (Provisional) to 6 January 1943)
 42d Bombardment Wing: 27 November 1944 – 6 January 1945, 21 May – 26 July 1945
 57th Bombardment Wing: 31 August 1943 – 1 January 1944
 63d Fighter Wing: 14 June – December 1945
 70th Fighter Wing: 2 December 1945 – 25 September 1947
 71st Fighter Wing: 25 September–November 1945
 87th Fighter Wing: 11 January-22 September 1944

 Groups

 12th Bombardment Group: 1 September 1943 – 2 January 1944
 31st Fighter Group: November 1942 – 24 July 1943
 33d Fighter Group: 13 January – 18 February 1943; 14 March 1943 – 24 July 1943; 21 December 1943 – c. 20 February 1944 (under operational control of 64th Fighter Wing)
 36th Fighter Group: 15 November 1945 – 15 February 1946
 47th Bombardment Group, assigned 27 September – 31 December 1942; 22 January – 18 February 1943; attached 1 September 1943 – 6 October 1943; 10 December 1943 – 20 July 1944; 7–15 September 1944
 50th Fighter Group, 29 September 1944 – 4 August 1945 (under operational control of 64th Fighter Wing until June 1945)
 52nd Fighter Group: 18 February – 23 May 1943; 15 May – 25 June 1947
 57th Fighter Group: attached 22 August 1943; assigned 1 September – 1 November 1943; 2 January – 23 April 1944 (attached to 64th Fighter Wing 2–28  March 1944)
 68th Observation Group (later 68th Reconnaissance Group): c. 18 October 1942 – c. 18 June 1943 (attached to 5th Bombardment Wing after 31 October 1942)
 69th Tactical Reconnaissance Group: 27 March – 20 May 1945
 79th Fighter Group: attached c. 2–c. 14 June 1943; assigned 1 September – 1 November 1943 (attached to Northwest African Tactical Air Force)
 86th Fighter-Bomber Group (later 86th Fighter Group): assigned c. November 1943 – 9 September 1944; 20 February 1945 – c. 30 April 1945 (attached to 64th Fighter Wing after 21 February 1945; attached 30 April 1945); assigned 20 June – August 1945; 1 March – 6 October 1947
 340th Bombardment Group: 1 September – 1 November 1943; 2 January – 1 March 1944
 354th Fighter Group, 4 July 1945 – 15 February 1946
 363d Reconnaissance Group, 15–20 November 1945
 366th Fighter Group: 4 July 1945 – 20 August 1946
 501st Tactical Control Group (see 555th Signal Aircraft Warning Battalion)

 Squadrons

 2d Air Support Communications Squadron (later 2d Tactical Air Communications Squadron): 2 February 1943 – 6 July 1943
 4th Tactical Air Communications Squadron: 4 July 1945 – 5 June 1947
 11th Tactical Air Communications Squadron: 4 July – c. 12 October 1945
 14th Liaison Squadron: 4 July – 5 October 1945 (attached to Third Army after 26 June 1945)
 18th Air Support Communications Squadron (later 18th Tactical Air Communications Squadron): c. 12 February – 10 June 1944
 34th Photographic Reconnaissance Squadron: 3 October 1944 – 20 April 1945 (attached to Provisional Reconnaissance Group after 16 October 1944)
 47th Liaison Squadron: 23 November 1945 – 1 February 1946
 72d Liaison Squadron: 20 May – 3 July 1945
 99th Fighter Squadron: 28 May 1943 – 1 May 1944 (attached to 33d Fighter Group, 29 May 1943; 324th Fighter Group, c. 19 June 1943; 33d Fighter Group 19 July 1943; 79th Fighter Group, 16 October 1943; 324th Fighter Group after 1 April 1944)
 111th Observation Squadron (later 111th Reconnaissance Squadron, 111th Tactical Reconnaissance Squadron): attached 12–31 March 1943, 20 June 1943, assigned 26 May 1944 – 20 April 1945 (attached to Provisional Reconnaissance Group after  16 October 1944)
 125th Liaison Squadron: 20 June – 15 December 1945
 153d Liaison Squadron: attached 25 April 1944, assigned 15 July 1945 – 15 December 1945 (attached to Twelfth Army Group 15 November 1944, Seventh Army after 26 July 1945)
 162d Tactical Reconnaissance Squadron: attached 16 October 1944 – 21 April 1945
 167th Liaison Squadron: 20 May – 15 July 1945
 365th Bombardment Squadron: 1 November – 25 December 1946
 415th Night Fighter Squadron: 12 October – 5 December 1943
 417th Night Fighter Squadron: 17 May – 26 June 1945

 Other
 555th Signal Aircraft Warning Battalion (later 501st Tactical Control Group), 15 November 1945 – 25 July 1947

References

Notes
 Explanatory notes

 Citations

Bibliography

  
 
 
 

Tac12
Military units and formations disestablished in 1948